The Golden Glades Interchange, located in Miami Gardens and North Miami Beach, Florida, United States, is the confluence of six major roads serving eastern and southern Florida. It is named after the original name of North   167th Street, Golden Glades Road.

Description

The six highways that come together at the interchange are U.S. Route 441 (US 441), Florida's Turnpike, the Palmetto Expressway (signed State Road 826), SR 9, North Miami Beach Boulevard (NW 167th Street) and Interstate 95 (I-95). US 441 bears SR 7 as a hidden designation, and the turnpike is similarly SR 91. SR 9 is the hidden designation for I-95 north of the interchange but branches southward off I-95 to become a major commercial road on its own accord. South of the interchange, I-95 bears SR 9A as its hidden designation.

History
The Golden Glades interchange initially opened as an intersection between US 441 and SR 826 in 1953, expanding into its current form in the next decade.  Its construction was prompted by a sequence of events spanning 12 years. In 1950, US 441 was extended from downtown Orlando to Miami to connect with a stretch of US 41 which sported US 94 road signs just a year earlier. In 1957, Florida's Turnpike (then called the Sunshine State Parkway) was completed in Dade (later Miami-Dade) County, joining SR 826 (which, at the time was Golden Glades Drive, an east–west street connecting US 1 along Biscayne Bay to US 27 inland). In 1958, construction of the north–south section of the Palmetto Bypass Expressway started, using SR 826 with a 90-degree eastward curve (the western section of SR 826 was to be abandoned). In 1959, construction of a segment of I-95, from Northwest 20th Street in Miami to SR 84 in Fort Lauderdale was started, along with I-195 and the Airport Expressway (SR 112) for access to Miami Beach and Miami International Airport. In 1961, construction of the Palmetto Bypass Expressway (the name was unofficially shortened in the mid 1960s), the Airport Expressway (then called the 36th Street Tollway), and the segment of I-95 south of Northwest 95th Street in Dade County were completed.

Anticipating increasing traffic to and from Dade County, FDOT broke ground on May 18, 1962, for the new Golden Glades Interchange.  The section of I-95 from Golden Glades to SR 84 was completed in 1963; the Golden Glades Interchange and I-95 south to Northwest 95th Street opened on June 9, 1964.

The interchange was also known as the Interama Interchange until it was renamed the Golden Glades Interchange in 1977.

Flyovers to a commuter train station and bus terminal (in the 1970s) and elevated HOV lanes (in 1995) have been added to it to accommodate the growing regional population, which has more than doubled since the interchange's opening.  There were plans in the 1980s to reconstruct the interchange, but they were dropped due to high construction costs. The Golden Glades has been expanded and worked on several times over the years and is seen as a bottleneck in traffic on all the roads it incorporates. 

In 2017, the Florida Department of Transportation plans to widen the turnpike connector to I-95 to five lanes, including two lanes from the turnpike and three lanes from the eastbound Palmetto Expressway. Three lanes will exit to a relocated off-ramp to State Road 7 while the other three lanes will continue to I-95, which will get another lane between the Golden Glades and Northwest 151st Street. The entrance to the southbound express lanes south of the Golden Glades also will be moved 300 feet further south. In addition, the eastbound Palmetto ramp to I-95 will be widened to three lanes – two to southbound I-95 and one on a new direct ramp to northbound I-95.

See also
Transportation in South Florida
Dolphin–Palmetto Interchange
Midtown Interchange
Rainbow Interchange

References

Interstate 95
U.S. Route 441
Road interchanges in the United States
North Miami Beach, Florida
Miami Gardens, Florida
1953 establishments in Florida